A Peace Conference at the Quai d'Orsay is an oil-on-canvas painting by Irish artist William Orpen, completed in 1919.  It was one of the paintings commissioned from Orpen to commemorate the Paris Peace Conference in 1919. The work is held by the Imperial War Museum in London.

Background
Orpen was one of the first people chosen as a war artist by the British Ministry of Information in 1917.  Orpen was also official painter at the peace conference, and was commissioned to paint three canvases to record the roles of the politicians, diplomats and military at the conference.

The work is a group portrait depicting preliminary discussions of the "Council of Ten", comprising two delegates each from Britain, France, the United States, Italy and Japan.  Conference delegates are depicted sitting and standing around a table in the Hall of Clocks at the French Ministry of Foreign Affairs at the Quai d'Orsay in Paris, where the conference was formally opened on 18 January 1919.  The politicians and diplomats are overshadowed by the decorated room, with chandeliers, lavish gilded cornice, and a statue of Victory above an ornate fireplace. It measures

Subjects
The people depicted are:

Seated, from left to right:
 Vittorio Emanuele Orlando, former Prime Minister of Italy
 Robert Lansing, US Secretary of State
 Woodrow Wilson, President of the United States, holding papers
 Georges Clemenceau, Prime Minister of France
 David Lloyd George, British Prime Minister 
 Bonar Law, British Lord Privy Seal (and later Prime Minister)
 Arthur Balfour, British Secretary of State for Foreign Affairs and former British Prime Minister
Standing behind, from left to right:
 Paul Hymans, Belgian Minister for Foreign Affairs
 Eleftherios Venizelos, Prime Minister of Greece
 Emir Feisal, from Syria (later King of Syria and then King of Iraq)
 William Massey, Prime Minister of New Zealand
 General Jan Smuts, Prime Minister of South Africa
 Colonel Edward M. House behind Wilson
 General Louis Botha, former Prime Minister of South Africa
 Marquis Saionji Kinmochi, genrō and former Prime Minister of Japan
 Billy Hughes, Prime Minister of Australia
 Sir Robert Borden, Prime Minister of Canada
 George Nicoll Barnes, British Minister Without Portfolio representing Organised Labour
 Ignace Paderewski, Polish Minister of Foreign Affairs

Other paintings
Orpen's other paintings of the conference depict the signing of the Versailles Peace Treaty in the Hall of Mirrors at the Palace of Versailles, and another showing a coffin lying in state in a marble hall covered by a Union Flag.

External links
 A Peace Conference at the Quai d'Orsay, Imperial War Museum
The Signing of Peace in the Hall of Mirrors, Versailles, 28th June 1919, Imperial War Museum
Breaking the Heart of the World: Woodrow Wilson and the Fight for the League of Nations, John Milton Cooper, Cambridge University Press, 2001, p. 412
The Treaty of Versailles, 1919: A Primary Source Examination of the Treaty that Ended World War I, Corona Brezina, The Rosen Publishing Group, 2005, p. 24

1919 paintings
War paintings
Treaty of Versailles
Paintings in the collection of the Imperial War Museum
Paintings by William Orpen
Group portraits
20th-century portraits
Portraits of men
Portraits of politicians
Cultural depictions of Woodrow Wilson
Cultural depictions of David Lloyd George
Bonar Law
Jan Smuts
Eleftherios Venizelos